Apocatops is a genus of beetles belonging to the family Leiodidae.

Species:
 Apocatops monguzzii 
 Apocatops nigrita

References

Leiodidae